P. K. Gurudasan (born 10 July 1935) is an Indian politician, trade unionist, and a member of Communist Party of India (Marxist). He was the Minister for Excise, Labour and Employment in the Government of Kerala headed by VS Achuthanandan between 2006 and 2011. He represented Kollam Assembly constituency in the Kerala Legislative Assembly from 2006 to 2016. He is also the State President of Centre of Indian Trade Unions (CITU) and a member of Central Committee of CPI(M). Gurudasan earlier served as the General Secretary of Kerala State unit of CITU.

Career
Gurudasan was born to Krishnan and Yesodha on 10 July 1935 at Paravur in Kollam district. After completing his school and college education Gurudasan joined the Communist party at a young age. He was jailed during the Emergency period for 19 months in Poojappura Central Prison.

See also 
 Kerala Council of Ministers

References

External links
 P.K. Gurudasan denies AITUC allegations

Malayali politicians
Communist Party of India (Marxist) politicians from Kerala
Politicians from Kollam
1935 births
Living people
Sree Narayana College, Kollam alumni
Trade unionists from Kerala
Kerala MLAs 2011–2016